Felix Wong Yat-wah (born September 4, 1961) is a Hong Kong actor and singer best known for his performances in many wuxia television series produced by TVB, such as The Legend of the Condor Heroes (1983), in which he played the protagonist Kwok Ching. He is considered to be one of the most popular teen idols of the 1980s and was named as "Third Tiger"  among Five Tiger Generals of TVB.

Career
Wong was recruited into TVB's Artist Training Academy in September 1979, before his 18th birthday. While he was a trainee, he made cameo appearances in several dramas, such as The Bund (1980). After finish the secondary school in 1981, Wong was offered a major supporting role in The Misadventure of Zoo (1981), which starred Lydia Shum and Adam Cheng. Afterwards, Wong was immediately cast to play the male lead in The Lonely Hunter (1981), which subsequently propelled him to instant fame in Hong Kong. While the drama was airing, Wong received more fan letters than any other popular TVB actors and actresses at the time.

In the mid-1980s, Wong, along with Andy Lau, Tony Leung, Michael Miu and Kent Tong, were called the "Five Tiger Generals of TVB" and said to be the most popular male actors from TVB at that time. According to some polls conducted at the time, Wong had the largest fanbase.

Wong is perhaps best known for his role as the hero Kwok Ching in the 1983 television series The Legend of the Condor Heroes, an adaptation of Louis Cha's novel of the same title. Wong also starred in another two television adaptations of Cha's novels, Demi-Gods and Semi-Devils (1982) and Sword Stained with Royal Blood (1986). Wong is also notable for his performance in Looking Back in Anger (1989), in which his character was involved in a love triangle with the characters played by Carina Lau and Kathy Chow. Besides playing the roles of the protagonists in most of his works, Wong has also achieved success for his portrayals of antagonists, such as the villain Lee Mat in The Grand Canal (1987), Jamukha in Genghis Khan (1987), and recently as Stone Sir in Gun Metal Grey (2010).

In 1989, Wong left TVB after having completed filming Kim-mo Tuk-ku Kau-pai. He joined ATV and worked on four television series between 1990 and 1992. He also worked in the Taiwanese television drama Imperial Wanderer with Kathy Chow. Wong returned to TVB in 1993 and starred with Amy Chan in Racing Peak, a television series about a horse racing company. He left TVB again on 11 January 2002 to work on some mainland Chinese television series. Wong expressed his unhappiness with TVB in an interview, citing that as the reason for his departure. His last major project in TVB was Treasure Raiders, an adaptation of one of the works of Gu Long.

Wong starred in the 2005 film Wait 'til You're Older after being invited by Andy Lau. In July 2009, after filming Turning Point, Wong revealed that he will be working with Michael Miu in a new crime fiction television drama on TVB in October 2009 called Gun Metal Grey.

Personal life
Wong started dating fellow actress Leung Kit-wah in 1982 and they got married on December 7, 1988. They have a daughter, Adrian Wong Tsz-ching, on May 1, 1990. Leung died of organ failure at Gleneagles Hong Kong Hospital on May 26, 2020.

Filmography

Film

Television

References

External links
 
 

1961 births
Hong Kong male television actors
Hong Kong male film actors
TVB actors
Living people
20th-century Hong Kong male actors
21st-century Hong Kong male actors